Vishal Sareen (born in 1973) is an International Master of chess. He has coached several well-known Grand Masters and International Masters in chess in his two decades of coaching. He was awarded with the UT Dallas Trainer Award in chess and holds the FIDE Senior Trainer (FST) title. He has coached the Indian women's team in multiple world and Asian tournaments.

References

External links
 

1973 births
Indian chess players
Chess International Masters
Living people
Place of birth missing (living people)
Date of birth missing (living people)